The 2012 Mubadala World Tennis Championship in December is a non-ATP affiliated exhibition tournament. The world's top players competed in the event, which was held in a knockout format. The prize money for the winner was $250,000. The event was held at the Abu Dhabi International Tennis Complex at the Zayed Sports City in Abu Dhabi, United Arab Emirates. It was a warm-up event for the 2013 tennis season, with the ATP World Tour beginning on December 31, 2012.

Seeds

Draw

Draw

External links
Official website

World Tennis Championship
Capitala World Tennis Championship
World Tennis Championship